Karl Friedrich Wilhelm Rußwurm (also known as Carl Friedrich Wilhelm or just von Rußwurm; 25 November 1812 in Ratzeburg, Germany – 17 February 1883 in Reval (Tallinn), Estonia) was a German-Estonian pedagogue, ethnologist and historian.

Life and work
Rußwurm came from a family of theologians and educators. His younger brother,  (1814–1890), later became the provost of Ratzeburg.

After attending the cathedral school his father taught, he studied theology in Bonn and Berlin. In 1831, he became a member of the Burschenschaft Populonia Bonn and in 1832 a member of the Kränzchenverein Berlin. In 1835, he went to Estonia as a private tutor. In 1839, he was appointed inspector of the Knights and Domschule at Reval (now Tallinn). In 1841, he moved to the health resort town of Hapsal (now Haapsalu), where he initially worked as a teacher and later as an inspector of the local county school. After his retirement in 1868, he worked on scientific works and returned to Reval, where he was appointed an archivist of the Estonian chancery. He dealt mainly with Estonian cultural history and ethnography and the genealogy of Baltic German families. In Hapsal, his most important work was Eibofolke or The Swedes On the Coast of Esthland and Runö (Runö now being modern Ruhnu), where he received the prestigious Demidov Prize.

Works 
 Nordische Sagen. Der deutschen Jugend erzählt und mit einem wissenschaftlichen Anhange versehen. Leipzig: Fleischer 1842
 Eibofolke oder die Schweden an der Küste Esthlands und auf Runö, eine ethnographische Untersuchung mit Urkunden, Topographie und Geschichte, Erser Theil, Reval 1855
 Eibofolke oder die Schweden an der Küste Esthlands und auf Runö, eine ethnographische Untersuchung mit Urkunden, Tabellen und lithographirten Beilagen, Zweiter Theil, Reval 1855 E-Text
 Geschichte Alt-Pernau's. Reval 1880
 Nachrichten über das Geschlecht Ungern-Sternberg. Reval 1872–1875
 Nachrichten über das adeliche und freiherrliche Geschlecht Stael von Holstein esthländischer Linie.
 Genealogia Lutherorum rediviva oder die Familie Luther in Esthland und Rußland. (posthum) Reval 1883.

Further reading 
 
 Helge Dvorak: Biographisches Lexikon der Deutschen Burschenschaft. Band I Politiker, Teilband 5: R–S. Heidelberg 2002, S. 149–150.

External links

Notes

References

1812 births
1883 deaths
19th-century German educators
19th-century German historians
19th-century German writers
19th-century German male writers
German ethnologists
German genealogists
People from Ratzeburg